Mary Fenner Dallman (April 11, 1935 - December 21, 2021) was an American neuroendocrinologist and professor emerita at University of California, San Francisco, where she was the first tenure-track female faculty member in the Department of Physiology and worked for 38 years before retiring in 2007. She is known for her elucidation of the hypothalamic-pituitary-adrenal axis, and the discovery that comfort foods dampen the stress response.

Life 
Mary Dallman has three children with her husband Peter Dallman, a professor of pediatric medicine at UCSF.

Career 

Dallman received her bachelor's degree in Chemistry from Smith College (1956) and completed her Ph.D. in Physiology at Stanford University in the laboratory of F. Eugene Yates (1967). Dallman then pursued two post-doctoral training stints, the first in Neuroscience in Stockholm, Sweden with Bengt Andersson and the second at UCSF in Neuroendocrinology with William Francis Ganong. She stayed on at UCSF thereafter, hired first as a lecturer for two years, before establishing her own lab as an assistant professor (1972), rising to full professor and serving as vice chair of the department for fourteen years. She is now professor emerita at University of California, San Francisco, where she was the first tenure-track female faculty member in the Department of Physiology and worked for 38 years before retiring in 2007. 

She is known for her elucidation of function along the hypothalamic, pituitary, adrenal axis, and the discovery that comfort foods dampen the stress response.  Her lab explored the role of glucocorticoid feedback on the HPA axis, showing that there is a very fast (seconds-minutes) inhibitory effect, and that sufficiently intense stimuli to the stress-response system use central networks that appear to bypass central glucocorticoid inhibition of subsequent system activity. The lab also provided evidence that efferent adrenal nerves regulate both compensatory adrenal growth after unilateral adrenalectomy, and the diurnal rhythm in adrenocortical sensitivity to ACTH secretion. The finding that body weight, fat content, and activity in the HPA axis are tightly correlated, initiated subsequent studies that ultimately showed that only voluntary intake of lard inhibits adrenocortical responses to subsequent stressors.

Recognition
Dallman has been recognized for her contributions in many ways:
 1996-1998       International Society of Neuroendocrinology, President
 1997-2002	Editorial Boards Endocrinology, J. Neuroscience, Stress. Molec. Psychiatry.
 2003-2007	Receiving Editor Endocrinology; NIH workshops (Perimenopause; drug abuse; Alzheimer's Disease) and working group (Stress & CVD)
 2011-2014	Editorial Board, Endocrinology
 1980-2007	Member of 3 NIH PRGs – Endocrinology; NNB; DK Fellowships, K-awards.
 2003 	ISPNE Lifetime Achievement Award
 2006	Muldoon Memorial Lectureship
 2007	Selye Lectureship
 2010	Marianne Blum Lectureship, Austin TX
 2010	Soc Study Ingestive Behavior Distinguished Scientist Award
 2015 Kavli Foundation Lecture to the Society for Neuroscience, Chicago

References 

American neuroscientists
American women neuroscientists
Living people
Smith College alumni
Stanford University alumni
1935 births
University of California, San Francisco faculty